Dilpreet Singh (born 12 November 1999) is an Indian field hockey player who plays as a forward for the Indian national team.

Early life
He belongs to Butala, Amritsar district, Punjab, India. He was born to Balwinder Singh, who was a hockey player in Army and it was due to his encouragement that Dilpreet started playing this sport. He initially trained in Khadur Sahib Academy of his father and later on took coaching from Maharaja Ranjit Singh Hockey Academy located in Amritsar, and then from Jalandhar's Surjit Academy.

References

External links
Dilpreet Singh at Hockey India

1999 births
Living people
Field hockey players from Punjab, India
Indian male field hockey players
Male field hockey forwards
Olympic field hockey players of India
Field hockey players at the 2020 Summer Olympics
Field hockey players at the 2018 Commonwealth Games
Field hockey players at the 2018 Asian Games
2018 Men's Hockey World Cup players
Asian Games bronze medalists for India
Asian Games medalists in field hockey
Medalists at the 2018 Asian Games
Commonwealth Games competitors for India
Olympic bronze medalists for India
Medalists at the 2020 Summer Olympics
Olympic medalists in field hockey
Recipients of the Arjuna Award